Hortense Nguidjol Essesse (born 17 May 1981 in Cameroon) is a former Cameroonian weightlifter. She was a multiple medalist at the African Weightlifting Championships. She competed at the 2002 Commonwealth Games.

Major results

References

External links
 
 
 Hortense Nguidjol at the Openpowerlifting.org

1981 births
Living people
Weightlifters at the 2002 Commonwealth Games
Competitors at the 1999 All-Africa Games
Competitors at the 2007 All-Africa Games
Competitors at the 2015 African Games
Cameroonian female weightlifters
Cameroonian powerlifters
African Games bronze medalists for Cameroon
African Games medalists in weightlifting
Commonwealth Games competitors for Cameroon
20th-century Cameroonian women
21st-century Cameroonian women